Sandon Dock was a railway station on the Liverpool Overhead Railway, adjacent to the dock of the same name.

It was opened on 6 March 1893 by the Marquis of Salisbury. The station had a hydraulic lift bridge which enabled a section of track to be lifted up to allow large vehicles to pass underneath.

The station was an early closure, closing in 1896, to be replaced by nearby Huskisson Dock and Nelson Dock, located to the north and south respectively. No trace of this station remains.

References

External links
 Sandon Dock station on Subterranea Britannica

Disused railway stations in Liverpool
Former Liverpool Overhead Railway stations
Railway stations in Great Britain opened in 1893
Railway stations in Great Britain closed in 1896